The 1976 LFF Lyga was the 55th season of the LFF Lyga football competition in Lithuania.  It was contested by 26 teams, and Atmosfera Mazeikiai won the championship.

Group Zalgiris

Group Nemunas

Final

References
RSSSF

LFF Lyga seasons
1976 in Lithuania
LFF